Batma is an Arabic surname. Notable people with the surname include:

Dounia Batma (born 1991), Moroccan singer 
Larbi Batma (1948–1997), Moroccan musician, poet, singer, author, and actor
Imane Batma (born 1999), Moroccan singer 

Arabic-language surnames
Surnames of Moroccan origin